Amaury Antonio Cazana Marti (born October 19, 1976) is a Cuban professional baseball player who is a free agent.

Professional career

St. Louis Cardinals
He was drafted by the St. Louis Cardinals in the 18th round of the 2006 MLB June Amateur Draft.

In five seasons and 541 games of AAA-level ball, Cazana hit for a .344 batting average with 70 home runs and 322 runs batted in.

Cazana started the 2012 season with the Cardinals' AAA Memphis Redbirds. He was released on May 14, 2012.

Mexican League
On May 22, 2012, Cazana signed with the Acereros de Monclova of the Mexican League. On March 22, 2013, he was assigned to the Broncos de Reynosa. On June 28, 2013, Cazana was traded to the Rojos del Aguila de Veracruz in exchange for Carlos Rivera and Frank Diaz. He was released on April 4, 2014. On April 24, 2014, Cazana signed with the Toros de Tijuana. On May 13, 2014, Cazana was released. After 4 years out of baseball, Cazana signed with the Tecolotes de los Dos Laredos on July 3, 2018. Cazana did not play in a game in 2020 due to the cancellation of the Mexican League season because of the COVID-19 pandemic. He later became a free agent.

See also

List of baseball players who defected from Cuba

References

External links

baseballamerica.com

Palm Beach Cardinals players
Springfield Cardinals players
Memphis Redbirds players
1976 births
Living people
Petroleros de Minatitlán players
Acereros de Monclova players
Guerreros de Oaxaca players
Tecolotes de los Dos Laredos players
Defecting Cuban baseball players
Cuban expatriate baseball players in Mexico
Cocodrilos de Matanzas players
Águilas de Mexicali players
Broncos de Reynosa players
Diablos Rojos del México players
Mesa Solar Sox players
Peoria Saguaros players
Rojos del Águila de Veracruz players
Tigres del Licey players
Tomateros de Culiacán players
Toros de Tijuana players
Cuban expatriate baseball players in the Dominican Republic
Sportspeople from Matanzas